Irene Hannon is an American author of romance and romantic suspense novels.

A former  communications executive, she holds a BA in psychology from St. Louis University and an MA in journalism from the University of Missouri in Columbia.

Books 
 Sea Glass Cottage, April 5, 2022 release, romantic fiction, publisher: Revell
 Labyrinth of Lies, October 5, 2021 release, romantic fiction, Book 2: Triple Threat Series, publisher: Revell
 Blackberry Beach, April 6, 2021 release, romantic fiction, publisher: Revell
 Point of Danger, October 6, 2020 release, romantic suspense, Book 1: Triple Threat Series, publisher: Revell
 Starfish Pier, March 31, 2020 release, romantic fiction, publisher: Revell
 Dark Ambitions, October 1, 2019 release, romantic suspense, Book 3: Code of Honor Series, publisher: Revell
 Driftwood Bay, April 2, 2019 release, romantic fiction, publisher: Revell
 Hidden Peril, October 2, 2018 release, romantic suspense, Book 2: Code of Honor Series, publisher: Revell
 Pelican Point, April 3, 2018 release, romantic fiction, publisher: Revell
 Dangerous Illusions, October 3, 2017 release, romantic suspense, Book 1: Code of Honor Series, publisher: Revell 
 Sandpiper Cove, April 4, 2017 release, romantic fiction, publisher: Revell
 Tangled Webs, October 4, 2016 release, romantic suspense, Book 3: Men of Valor Series, publisher: Revell 
 Sea Rose Lane (A Hope Harbor novel), June 7, 2016 release, romantic fiction, publisher: Revell 
 Thin Ice, January 5, 2016 release, romantic suspense, Book 2: Men of Valor Series, publisher: Revell 
 Hope Harbor, August 4, 2015 release, romantic fiction, publisher: Revell 
 Buried Secrets, April 7, 2015 release, romantic suspense, Book 1: Men of Valor Series, publisher: Revell 
 Deceived, October 7, 2014 release, romantic suspense; Book 3: Private Justice Series, publisher: Revell
 Second Chance Summer, May 20, 2014 release, Book 4 Starfish Bay Series: , publisher: Harlequin/Love Inspired
 Trapped, September 1, 2013 release, romantic suspense; Book 2: Private Justice Series, publisher: Revell
 Seaside Blessings, May 21, 2013 release, Book 3 Starfish Bay Series: , publisher: Harlequin/Love Inspired
 Vanished, January 1, 2013 release, romantic suspense; Book 1: Private Justice Series, publisher: Revell
 Finding Home, September 1, 2012 release, Book 2 Starfish Bay Series, publisher: Harlequin/Love Inspired
 Lethal Legacy, August 1, 2012 release, romantic suspense; Book 3: Guardians of Justice Series, publisher: Revell
 Seaside Reunion, December 2011 release, Book 1 Starfish Bay Series, publisher: Harlequin/Love Inspired
 Deadly Pursuit, September 2011 release, romantic suspense; Book 2: Guardians of Justice Series, publisher: Revell
 The Heart Remembers, 2011, Originally published as "It Had To Be You", publisher: Harlequin/Love Inspired
 Fatal Judgment, January 2011 release, romantic suspense; Book 1: Guardians of Justice Series, publisher: Revell 
 In Harm's Way, April 2010 release, romantic suspense; Book 3: Heroes of Quantico Series, publisher: Revell; released in India, Pakistan, Bangladesh, Sri Lanka and Nepal by VITASTA PUBLISHING PVT LTD.
 An Eye For An Eye, September 2009 release, romantic suspense; Book 2: Heroes of Quantico Series, publisher: Revell; German, Swiss, Austrian title/publisher: Im Fadenkreuz des Zweifels/Francke. released in India, Pakistan, Bangladesh, Sri Lanka and Nepal by VITASTA PUBLISHING PVT LTD. Marketed & distributed in India and Sub-continent by Times Group Books, a division of Bennett, Coleman & Co. Ltd., New Delhi. 
 Against All Odds, February 2009 release, romantic suspense; Book 1: Heroes of Quantico Series, publisher: Revell; German, Swiss, Austrian title/publisher: Gegen jede Chance/Francke; Dutch title/publisher: Alle Schijn Tegen/Kok ten Have, Uitgeefmaatschappij. Released in India, Pakistan, Bangladesh, Sri Lanka and Nepal by VITASTA PUBLISHING PVT. LTD. 
 Child of Grace, February 2011 release, publisher: Harlequin/Love Inspired
 A Father for Zach, April 2010 release; Book 4: Lighthouse Lane Series, publisher: Harlequin/Love Inspired
 The Doctor's Perfect Match, January 2010 release; Book 3: Lighthouse Lane Series, publisher: Harlequin/Love Inspired
 The Hero Next Door, August 2009 release; Book 2: Lighthouse Lane Series, publisher: Harlequin/Love Inspired
 Tides Of Hope, May 2009 release; Book 1: Lighthouse Lane Series, publisher: Harlequin/Love Inspired
 Apprentice Father, February 2009 release, publisher: Harlequin/Love Inspired
 Where Love Abides, 2008, publisher: Harlequin/Love Inspired
 From This Day Forward, 2007, publisher: Harlequin/Love Inspired
 Rainbow's End, 2007, publisher: Harlequin/Love Inspired
 The Family Man, 2006, publisher: Harlequin/Love Inspired
 All Our Tomorrows, 2006, originally published 2006 by Harlequin/Love Inspired
 The Unexpected Gift, 2005, publisher: Harlequin/Love Inspired
 Gift From The Heart, 2005, publisher: Harlequin/Love Inspired
 The Best Gift, 2005, publisher: Harlequin/Love Inspired
 Crossroads, 2003, publisher: Harlequin/Love Inspired
 Never Say Goodbye, 2002, publisher: Harlequin/Steeple Hill
 The Way Home, 2000, publisher: Harlequin/Steeple Hill
 One Special Christmas, 1999, publisher: Harlequin/Steeple Hill
 It Had To Be You, 1999, publisher: Harlequin/Steeple Hill
 A Family To Call Her Own, 1998, ; reissued 2005, publisher: Harlequin/Steeple Hill
 A Groom Of Her Own, 1998, ; reissued 2005, publisher: Harlequin/Steeple Hill 
 Home For The Holidays, 1997, publisher: Harlequin/Steeple Hill
 A Delicate Balance, 1993, publisher: Avalon
 A Rainbow In The Glen, 1993, publisher: Avalon
 Mirror Image, 1992, publisher: Avalon 
 Spotlight On Love, 1992, publisher: Avalon
 When Lilacs Bloom, 1991, publisher: Avalon
 When The Heart Takes Wing, 1991, publisher: Avalon
 Portrait Of Love, 1985, publisher: Thomas Nelson 
 In Name Only, 1985, publisher: Thomas Nelson

Reissues and anthologies 
 The Heart Remembers, 2011, originally published as, "It Had To Be You," , publisher: Harlequin/Steeple Hill
 Love Inspired Classics: One Special Christmas/Home for the Holidays, 2010,, publisher: Harlequin/Steeple Hill
 Love Inspired Classics: The Best Gift & Gift From The Heart, 2009, publisher: Harlequin/Steeple Hill
 Love Inspired Classics: Never Say Goodbye & Crossroads, 2008, publisher: Harlequin/Steeple Hill 
 Love Inspired Classics: A Groom Of Her Own & The Way Home, 2008, publisher: Harlequin/Steeple Hill
 Together Again, contains "It Had To Be You," 2003, publisher: Harlequin/Steeple Hill
 The Three Gifts, contains "One Special Christmas," 2002, publisher: Harlequin/Steeple Hill
 Holiday Blessings, contains "Home For The Holidays," with Debbie Macomber and Janet Peart; 2000, publisher: Harlequin/Steeple Hill
 Crossings Inspirational Romance Reader, contains "A Family To Call Her Own," 1998, publisher: Harlequin/Steeple Hill

External links 
 Official website

Saint Louis University alumni
University of Missouri alumni
RITA Award winners